Johannes Thiele may refer to:

Johannes Thiele (zoologist)
Johannes Thiele (chemist)